Nakagawa stable (中川部屋 Nakagawa-beya) was a stable of sumo wrestlers, part of the Tokitsukaze ichimon or group of stables. It was founded on January 26, 2017 with nine wrestlers, all of whom were previously members of Kasugayama stable. That stable closed in October 2016, with its wrestlers living temporarily in Oitekaze stable. One of Oitekaze's coaches, Nakagawa-oyakata (former maegashira Asahisato), agreed to become the head coach of the newly formed stable. He effectively replaced Kasugayama-oyakata (former maegashira Hamanishiki), who was forced to resign from the Japan Sumo Association on January 16, 2017, because of a legal dispute with the previous Kasugayama-oyakata (former maegashira Kasugafuji) which meant he was unable to obtain the necessary toshiyori-kabu certificate to remain a stablemaster. As of January 2020 the stable had nine wrestlers.

In July 2020 reports emerged that the Sumo Association’s compliance committee was investigating complaints by wrestlers at the stable of power harassment leveled against Nakagawa-oyakata.
On 13th July 2020 it was decided that the stable would close down, Nakagawa would be demoted two ranks in the Sumo Association's hierarchy, and to be moved to Tokitsukaze stable. The remaining wrestlers and personnel will be distributed to a further seven stables.

Owner
2017 – 2020: 15th Nakagawa (iin, former maegashira Asahisato)

Notable active wrestlers

None

Referee
Shikimori　Yonokichi (makuuchi gyōji, real name Hiroshi Kikuchi)

Usher
Kōhei　(makushita yobidashi, real name Oyama Kōhei)

Hairdressers
Tokojin (1st class Tokoyama)
Tokoharu (3rd class Tokoyama)

Location and access
2-5-3 Otakawara, Kawasaki-ku, Kawasaki, Kanagawa Prefecture
3 minutes on foot from Sangyōdōro Station, Keikyū Daishi Line

See also
List of sumo stables

References

External links
Nakagawa stable at the Japan Sumo Association
Homepage
Defunct sumo stables